Mount Duida frogs (Dischidodactylus),  is a genus of craugastorid frogs endemic to the tepuis of southern Venezuela. The scientific name is derived from the Greek dischidos, meaning divided, and dactylos, meaning finger or toe, in reference to the divided ungual flap (see below).

Taxonomy
Placement of Dischidodactylus in the subfamily Ceuthomantinae (=Pristimantinae), family Craugastoridae, is based on morphology because no DNA sequence data are available. Dischidodactylus is closely related to Ceuthomantis, with which they share a synapomorphy: completely or almost completely divided ungual flaps. Both genera also have dorsal skin composed of small, flat, pliable (not keratinized) warts, and lack nuptial pads in adult males. They differ in that Dischidodactylus possess a dentigerous process of the vomer, and in that Ceuthomantis lack basal toe webbing. However, the AmphibiaWeb places Dischidodactylus in an entirely different family, Strabomantidae, implying a distant relationship with Ceuthomantis.

Description
Their head is not as wide as body. Tympanic membrane is not differentiated and tympanic annulus is visible below skin. Cranial crests are absent. Vomers have small, oblique dentigerous processes. Terminal discs are expanded, rounded, and bifurcate; circumferential groove is present and terminal phalanges are T-shaped. Dorsum is granular and venter is areolate.

Species
The genus contains two species:
 Dischidodactylus colonnelloi Ayarzagüena, 1985
 Dischidodactylus duidensis (Rivero, 1968)

References

 
Craugastoridae
Amphibian genera
Amphibians of South America
Endemic fauna of Venezuela
Taxa named by John Douglas Lynch
Amphibians of the Tepuis